This is a list of Baptist schools in the United States:
American Baptist College
Arkansas Baptist School System
B. H. Carroll Theological Institute
Baptist Bible College (Springfield, Missouri)
Baptist College of Florida
Baptist Park School
Baylor University
Boston Baptist College
Calvary Baptist School (Pennsylvania)
Calvary Baptist School (Wisconsin)
Dade Christian School
Denbigh Baptist Christian School
Delaware Christian School
Faith Baptist School (Fort Pierce, Florida)
Faith Baptist School, Michigan
First Baptist Christian School (Illinois)
Florence Christian School
Forcey Christian Middle School
Friendship Christian School (North Carolina)
Golden State Baptist College
Grace Academy (North Carolina)
Grace Baptist Christian School (Tifton, Georgia)
Grandview Park Baptist School
Heartland Baptist Bible College
High Point Christian Academy
Hillsdale Free Will Baptist College
Hilltop Baptist School
Hilltop Christian School
Houston Baptist University
Inter-City Baptist School
Liberty Baptist Academy
Liberty Christian Academy
Los Angeles Baptist High School
Louisiana Baptist University
Macon Road Baptist School
Montrose Christian School
Neuse Baptist Christian School
North Houston Baptist School, Houston
Northland Baptist Bible College
Ocean View Christian Academy
Orlando Christian Prep
Parkview Baptist High School
Parsonsfield Seminary
Raleigh Christian Academy
Sherwood Christian Academy
Shiloh Christian School
Southfield Christian School
Tattnall Square Academy
Temple Baptist Seminary
West Coast Baptist College
Whitefield Academy (Kentucky)

See also
Lists of schools in the United States
List of independent Catholic schools in the United States
List of international schools in the United States
List of Baptist colleges and universities in the United States

References

 
Baptist
Baptist schools in the United States